Hope, Future and Destiny is an album by American jazz flautist Nicole Mitchell, which was released in 2004 on Dreamtime, the label she established with David Boykin. It was the third recording by her Black Earth Ensemble. This work was the musical score for a multi-arts community play involving a cast of over 50 people in dance, video, acting and live original music.

Reception

In his review for AllMusic, Thom Jurek states "The music found on this disc is ambitious. Despite the work's sprawling reach, the music is deeply focused; its center is poetic, lyrical, and swinging. Her compositions reach across sound worlds, the African continent, and jazz genres."

In a review for JazzTimes Martin Johnson describes the album as "a fascinating sprawl full of classic musical references and Afrocentric concerns" and notes that "Mitchell's ambitious, quality music puts her firmly within the hallowed AACM tradition."

The All About Jazz review by Florence Wetzel states "The CD is an aural feast with some of the most joyful, uplifting jazz in recent memory, a panoply of sounds and textures including funk, Caribbean, Latin and blues, plus a healthy dose of the Association for the AACM aesthetic."

Track listing
All compositions by Nicole Mitchell.
 "Wondrous Birth (intro)" – 1:59
 "Wondrous Birth" – 6:23
 "Curbside Fantasee" – 6:52
 "For Daughters of Young Love" – 2:07
 "Journey for 3 Blue Stones" – 9:59
 "Message from the Mothergoddes" – 4:12
 "In the Garden" – 6:21
 "Skating" – 8:32
 "Wanna Make You Smile" – 1:29
 "Future's Meditation" – 6:53
 "The Healing Ritual" – 2:42
 "Time for Change" – 3:16
 "Journey for 3 Blue Stones" – 3:44

Personnel
 Nicole Mitchell – alto flute, vocals, flute, melodica
 David Boykin – tenor sax, soprano sax, bass clarinet
 Tony Herrera – trombone, shells
 Corey Wilkes – trumpet
 Savoir Faire – violin
 Tomeka Reid – cello
 Brian Nichols – piano, glockenspiel
 Tim Jones – guitar
 Josh Abrams – double bass
 Arveeayl Ra – drums, gongs
 Art "Turk" Burton – percussion
 Eddie Armstrong – shekere, rainstick, vocals
 Glenda Zahra Baker – vocals, rainstick
 Aquila Sadalla – vocals

References

2004 albums
Nicole Mitchell (musician) albums